South Korea, as Republic of Korea, competed at the 1976 Winter Olympics in Innsbruck, Austria.

Figure skating

Women

Speed skating

Men

Women

References
Official Olympic Reports

Korea, South
1976
1976 in South Korean sport